The 2022–23 South Dakota State Jackrabbits women's basketball represents South Dakota State University in the 2022–23 NCAA Division I women's basketball season. The Jackrabbits are led by twenty-third year head coach Aaron Johnston and they compete in the Summit League. They play their home games in Frost Arena in Brookings, South Dakota.

Previous season
The Jackrabbits went 29–9 overall and 17–1 in conference play. They finished tied for first in conference play and with tiebreaker system in place they were seeded number one in the 2022 Summit League Women's Basketball Tournament based on a higher NCA NET Ranking. The Jackrabbits finished off number eight seed Denver 86–59 in the first round and then passed by number four seed Oral Roberts 72−53. In the Championship game, the Jackrabbits would fall to the number two seed South Dakota Coyotes 45–56.

The Jackrabbits were one of the top teams to miss the 2022 NCAA Tournament, but were an automatic qualifier for the 2022 Women's National Invitation Tournament. In their first round game they played Ohio Bobcats and won 87–57. Their second round match-up against Big Ten opponent Minnesota Gophers ended with the Jackrabbits on top 78–57. The Jackrabbits faced the Drake Bulldogs in the third round of the WNIT and slipped past them 84−66. The Jackrabbits quarterfinals match was against SEC opponent Alabama Crimson Tide and beat them 78−73. The Jackrabbits' semifinal game was a rematch from November against the UCLA Bruins of the PAC-12 and like the first match-up ending in a Jackrabbits win, the Jackrabbits would move past the Bruins 62–59. The Jackrabbits, hosting the WNIT Championship game, played the Seton Hall Pirates and beat them 82-50 winning their first WNIT Championship.

Departures

Additions

Roster

Schedule

|-
!colspan=9 style=| Exhibition

|-
!colspan=9 style=| Non-conference regular season

|-
!colspan=9 style=| Summit League regular season

|-
!colspan=9 style=| Summit League Women's Tournament

|-
!colspan=9 style=| NCAA Women's Tournament

Schedule Source:

Rankings
2022–23 NCAA Division I women's basketball rankings

References

South Dakota State Jackrabbits women's basketball seasons
Jack
South Dakota State
Jack
South Dakota State